Myiodynastes is a genus of birds in the family Tyrannidae. Created by Charles Lucien Bonaparte in 1857, the genus contains five species which are collectively referred to as "sulphur-bellied flycatchers"; that name is also given to one of the individual species in the genus. The genus name Myiodynastes is a compound word composed from two Greek words: muia, meaning "fly" and dunastẽs, meaning "ruler".

List of species
The genus contains five species:
 Golden-bellied flycatcher (Myiodynastes hemichrysus)
 Golden-crowned flycatcher (Myiodynastes chrysocephalus)
 Baird's flycatcher (Myiodynastes bairdii)
Sulphur-bellied flycatcher (Myiodynastes luteiventris)
 Streaked flycatcher (Myiodynastes maculatus)

References

 
Bird genera
Taxa named by Charles Lucien Bonaparte
Higher-level bird taxa restricted to the Neotropics
Taxonomy articles created by Polbot